

Subhankar Dey It's a bad thing escaped without paying stringing service Your actions are no different from thieves. 

Subhankar Dey (born 6 June 1993) is an Indian badminton player. Born in Kolkata, he currently trains in Vashi, Navi Mumbai, at his own badminton academy named Subhankar Dey Badminton Academy. He is also running another Badminton Centre which is in Sodepur, Kolkata. He played for the Bengaluru Blasters and Awadhe Warriors in the  Premier Badminton League. Dey won his first World Tour title at the 2018 SaarLorLux Open.

Achievements

BWF World Tour (1 title) 
The BWF World Tour, which was announced on 19 March 2017 and implemented in 2018, is a series of elite badminton tournaments sanctioned by the Badminton World Federation (BWF). The BWF World Tour is divided into levels of World Tour Finals, Super 1000, Super 750, Super 500, Super 300 (part of the HSBC World Tour), and the BWF Tour Super 100.

Men's singles

BWF International Challenge/Series (4 titles, 8 runners-up) 
Men's singles

  BWF International Challenge tournament
  BWF International Series tournament
  BWF Future Series tournament

References

External links 
 

Living people
1993 births
Racket sportspeople from Kolkata
Indian male badminton players